Bridge FM may refer to one of the following radio stations:

Bridge FM (Dundee), an independent hospital radio station based in Ninewells Hospital, Dundee, Scotland
Bridge FM (Wales), commercial radio station from Bridgend County Borough, Wales
KYYR-LP, known as "The Bridge FM 97.9", a Christian radio station from Yakima, Washington, United States
WKJD, a Christian radio station in Columbus, Indiana, United States
WKTS, known as "The Bridge", a Christian radio station from Kingston, Tennessee, United States
WRDR, known as "The Bridge FM", a Christian radio station from Freehold, New Jersey, United States
WJUX, a simulcast of WRDR, out of South Fallsburg, New York, United States